Gholamreza Mohammadi (born 29 December 1970 in Khorramabad) is an Iranian freestyle wrestling coach and former wrestler.

Mohammadi is currently the head coach of the Iran's freestyle wrestling national team. He was also the head coach of the Iranian national wrestling team from 2005 to 2010.

Awards and honors

As head coach 

 World Wrestling Championships
 2019:  Nur-Sultan, Kazakhstan
 2013:  Budapest, Hungary
 2011:  Istanbul, Turkey
 2010: 4th, Moscow, Russia
 2009:  Herning, Denmark
 2006:  Guangzhou, China
 2005: 6th, Budapest, Hungary
 Wrestling World Cup
 2013:  Tehran, Iran
 2011:  Makhachkala, Russia
 2010:  Moscow Russia
 2009:  Tehran, Iran
 2007:  Krasnoyarsk, Russia
 Asian Wrestling Championships
 2020:  New Delhi, India
 2019:  Xi'an, China
 2011:  Tashkent, Uzbekistan
 2010:  New Delhi, India
 2009:  Pattaya, Thailand
 2005:  Wuhan, China
 2003:  New Delhi, India
 Asian Games
 2010:  Guangzhou, China
 2006:  Doha, Qatar
 World University Wrestling Championships
2016:  Çorum, Turkey
 Summer Universiade
 2005: 4th, İzmir, Turkey
 2013: 8th, Kazan, Russia
 Cadet World Wrestling Championship
 2018:  Zagreb, Croatia
 2017: 4th , Athens, Greece
 Cadet Asian Wrestling Championship
 2018:  Tashkent, Uzbekistan
 2017:  Bangkok, Thailand
 2007:  Taichung, Chinese Taipei

External links
www.sports-reference.com
UWW Profile

1970 births
Living people
Olympic wrestlers of Iran
Wrestlers at the 1996 Summer Olympics
Iranian male sport wrestlers
Wrestlers at the 1994 Asian Games
World Wrestling Championships medalists
Asian Games competitors for Iran
People from Khorramabad